Boulevard of Broken Dreams is a studio album by the British rock band Smokie, released in 1989 on Wag Records (on PolyGram Records AS Norway in continental Europe).

Commercial performance 
The album spent seven weeks at no. 1 in Norway. The band's next album, Whose Are Thouse Boots? (1990), would also reach no. 1 in Norway.

Track listing 
All tracks were produced by Simon Humphrey, except for "Young Hearts" produced by Dieter Bohlen at studio 33, Hamburg, West Germany.

Charts

References

External links 
 Smokie – Boulevard of Broken Dreams at Discogs

1990 albums
Smokie (band) albums
Wag Records albums
Polydor Records albums